Anna Rosina de Gasc (born: Anna Rosina Lisiewska) (10 July 1713 – 26 March 1783) was a German portrait painter.

Early life 
Anna Rosina was born into a family of painters of Polish noble origin in Berlin. Her mother was Maria Elizabeth Kahl from Pomerania. Her father, Georg Lisiewski (1674–1751), taught painting to Rosina and her siblings Anna Dorothea (1721–1782) and Christoph Friedrich (1725–1794). She later studied with the painter Antoine Pesne and learned his style of painting.

Career 
In 1757, Rosina was appointed as court painter by Frederick Augustus of Anhalt-Zerbst. During her ten-year stay at the court, she painted a gallery of forty ladies. Later, she moved to the ducal court in Brunswick, where she received a generous grant from Duchess Philippine Charlotte of Brunswick-Wolfenbüttel.

Her work is held in the permanent collections of several museums worldwide, including the Kunsthistorisches Museum, the University of Michigan Museum of Art, and the National Museum, Warsaw.

Later life 
In 1741, Anna Rosina married the Prussian court painter David Matthieu (1697–1755) and became the stepmother of Georg David Matthieu. After David's death, she married in 1760 to Louis de Gasc, who was a friend of Gotthold Ephraim Lessing.  She had two children with him.

Anna Rosina de Gasc died in 1783 in Dresden.

Honors 
 1757: Court painter in Anhalt-Zerbst
 1769: Honorary Member of the Dresden Academy of Fine Arts
 1777: court painter of the Duchy of Brunswick-Wolfenbüttel

Gallery

References 

 Anna Rosina de Gasc, in: Ulrich Thieme, Felix Becker et al.: Allgemeines Lexikon der Bildenden Künstler von der Antike bis zur Gegenwart, vol. 23, E. A. Seemann, Leipzig, 1929, p. 283
 Frances Borzello: Wie Frauen sich sehen. Selbstbildnisse aus fünf Jahrhunderten, Karl Blessing Verlag, Munich, 1998
 Gottfried Sello: Malerinnen aus fünf Jahrhunderten, Ellert & Richter, Hamburg, 1988,

External links 

 

Neoclassical painters
1713 births
1783 deaths
18th-century German painters
18th-century German women artists
Artists from Berlin
18th-century Polish nobility
German portrait painters
German women painters
Deaths in Germany
Court painters
German neoclassical painters
German people of Polish descent